Arthur Augustus Hollis, MM (20 May 1878 – 27 October 1955) was an Australian rules footballer who played for the South Melbourne Football Club in the Victorian Football League (VFL).

Notes

External links 

1878 births
1955 deaths
Australian rules footballers from Melbourne
Sydney Swans players
Footscray Football Club (VFA) players
Australian recipients of the Military Medal
People from Williamstown, Victoria